Opera House Vidhan Sabha constituency was one of the 288 constituencies in the Maharashtra Legislative Assembly from Mumbai area, in India. The constituency existed until the 2004 elections and was part of Mumbai South Lok Sabha constituency. It became defunct after the constituency map was redrawn.

Members of Vidhan Sabha
 1952-1972 : Seat did not exist
 1978: Jayawantiben Mehta, Janata Party
 1980: Jayawantiben Mehta, Bharatiya Janata Party
 1985: Chandrashekhar Prabhu, Indian National Congress 
 1990: Chandrakant Padwal, Shiv Sena
 1995: Chandrakant Padwal, Shiv Sena
 1999: Chandrakant Padwal, Shiv Sena
 2004: Arvinda Nerkar, Shiv Sena
 2008 onwards : The seat does not exist.

See also
 South Mumbai
 Mumbai City district
 List of constituencies of Maharashtra Legislative Assembly

References

Mumbai City district
Former assembly constituencies of Maharashtra